Gerard Lee Bevan (9 November 1869 – 24 April 1936) was a British financier, the man "most responsible for the entire City Equitable debacle", and "a daring and unprincipled scoundrel". In December 1922 he was convicted at the Old Bailey of fifteen charges of fraud and sentenced to seven years' penal servitude.

Early life 
Gerard Lee Bevan was born on 9 November 1869. He was the fourth son of Francis Bevan, chairman of Barclays Bank from 1896 to 1916.

He was educated at Eton and Trinity College, Cambridge.

Career 
Bevan had "magnetic charm" and became a stockbroker with Ellis & Co, an old-established and reputable City firm. He was very successful and highly respected until his "crash" in the 1920s.

He was chairman of the City Equitable Fire Insurance Co. In a major 1925 court case, Re City Equitable Fire Insurance Co, the company lost £1,200,000 in failure of investments and the large scale fraud of the chairman, ‘a daring and unprincipled scoundrel’. The liquidator sued the other directors for negligence. The auditors were sued too, but the Court of Appeal held they were honest and exonerated by provisions in the company’s articles.

The story has been written up in Martin Vander Weyer's 'Fortune's Spear: The Story of the Blue-Blooded Rogue Behind the Most Notorious City Scandal of the 1920s'. 2012. Elliott & Thompson.

Personal life
He married Sophie Kenrick, also from a wealthy family, Midlands industrialists related to the Chamberlains. They bought a house in Upper Grosvenor Street, and Bevan collected Chinese porcelain. He was also a "serial adulterer, treating glamorous mistresses ostentatiously".

He married twice, had issue and died in Havana, Cuba on 24 April 1936.

References

1869 births
1936 deaths
Businesspeople from London
People educated at Eton College
Alumni of Trinity College, Cambridge
English bankers
English people of Welsh descent
Gerard Lee